Denis Caverzasi (born 9 August 1994) is an Italian professional footballer who plays as a defender for  club Pro Sesto.

Club career
On 12 January 2019, he signed with Renate.

On 20 August 2019, he moved to Serie D club Pro Sesto.

Honours

Club 
 Monza
Serie D: 2016-17
Scudetto Dilettanti: 2016-17

References

External links
 

1994 births
Living people
Sportspeople from Como
Footballers from Lombardy
Italian footballers
Association football midfielders
Serie C players
Serie D players
S.S.D. Varese Calcio players
S.C. Caronnese S.S.D. players
A.C. Monza players
A.C. Renate players
S.S.D. Pro Sesto players